There are a number of performing arts venues named California Theatre.
 California Theatre (Berkeley)
 California Theatre (Los Angeles)
 California Theatre (San Bernardino)
 California Theatre (San Jose) - the home of Opera San José
 California Theatre (Pittsburg)
 California Theatre (San Francisco) - Demolished, formerly at what is now 440 Bush St, San Francisco, CA, 94108–3731.